Mutee Head is a headland about 20 km west of Bamaga at the tip of Cape York Peninsula, in Queensland, Australia.

During World War II the No 52 Radar Station moved from Mascot in New South Wales to Townsville in north Queensland and finally to Mutee Head. No. 52 Radar Station was based at Mutee Head from 29 March 1943 until 29 September 1945.

The Injinoo people in the Mutee Head area actively assisted with the war effort. They helped with the construction of facilities and in the water transport unit to New Guinea.

The establishment of the large airfield at Higgins Field impacted greatly on the Aboriginal community. Many of the community moved to bush camps to escape the soldiers who they were suspicious of, particularly the young women. Only the older people remained in the village. Many children worked as runners carrying messages from Mutee Head to the wharf at Mutee Head (Ukumba), to Higgins Field airfield, the hospital, and the communications base close to the tip.

Landforms of Far North Queensland